Iolani School, located at 563 Kamoku Street in Honolulu, Hawaii, is a private coeducational college preparatory school serving over 2,020 students with a boarding program for grades 9 - 12 as well as a summer boarding program for middle school grades. Founded in 1863 by Father William R. Scott, it was the principal school of the former Anglican Church of Hawaii. It was patronized by Kamehameha IV and Queen Emma who gave the school its name in 1870. Iolani in the Hawaiian language means "heavenly hawk". Today, Iolani School is affiliated with the Episcopal Church in the United States. It is administered by a Board of Governors and is one of the largest independent schools in the United States.

History

Early years
On October 11, 1862, Lord Bishop Thomas Nettleship Staley arrived in Hawaiʻi by request of Kamehameha IV and Queen Victoria of the United Kingdom.  The following year Kamehameha IV, a devout member of the Church of England, established the Hawaiian Reformed Catholic Church, also known as the Anglican Church of Hawaiʻi. The school was originally named for Saint Alban.

In 1863, Staley's companion Father Scott purchased land in Lāhaina and established Luaʻehu School, a school for boys. When Father Scott fell ill and returned to Britain, Father George Mason was summoned by Staley to administer the school on Maui. On January 12, 1863, the St. Alban's College was also established in the Pauoa Valley in Honolulu. Mason also seemed to have managed this school as well. Before Staley, too, left the islands for Britain in 1870, Father Mason merged the two schools and relocated it to the St. Alban's campus. Later Bishop Alfred Willis purchased land on Bates Street in Nuʻuanu Valley and moved part of the school there, intending it for students of full or part Hawaiian descent, under the new name of ʻIolani College. The St. Alban's College, intended for white students, separated and continuing operating at Pauoa until 1887.

With the overthrow of the Kingdom of Hawaiʻi and annexation to the United States in 1898, the Anglican Church of Hawaiʻi became part of the Episcopal Church United States (ECUSA). Iolani School was moved to Nuʻuanu, transferred back to downtown Honolulu and then moved to Nuʻuanu a second time. It remained in Nuʻuanu from 1927 to 1953, when it was moved to the present Ala Wai site. The elementary school was moved to the Ala Wai site in 1946.

In 1979, the school became co-educational, ending its all-male enrollment policy.

Development
Iolani School grew and refined its program offerings with a standard college preparatory curriculum as a foundation for every student.  Religion, performing and visual arts, music, and athletics became integral parts of the Iolani School education. As such, all students in fourth grade must be involved in performing arts.

Returning to its history of being a boarding school, Iolani opened its newly constructed residential dormitories for boarding students in February of 2019.

Campus

The campus is divided into Upper and Lower School.
Buildings include Castle Building, Weinberg Building, the I-Wing, the art building, the Nangaku Building, the Sullivan Center for Innovation and Learning, Boarding Dormitories, the Kaneshiro Science and Innovation Center, and the Sidney and Minnie Kosasa Performance Studios and Courtyard. Other facilities include the Upper Gym and the Lower Gym, the Tsuzuki Library, the Dillingham Pool, the FabLab, and St. Alban's Chapel. Iolani School also has a stadium (Kozuki Stadium), a baseball field, an outdoor basketball court (the One Team Field house), and several tennis courts.

Upper School
The Harold K.L. Castle Building was dedicated in 1980 to the Castle Family which had donated land to 'Iolani School. The Castle Building also contains most classrooms for the 7th and 8th Grade. Orchestra and Choir also use this building for their Performing Arts classes for both Upper and Lower School students.

The Sullivan Center for Innovation and Leadership was finished at the end of 2012 for the replacement of the Upper School Library. The Sullivan Center was created to emphasize sustainability and includes classrooms, laboratories, an auditorium, and a garden among other facilities.

Lower School
The Kaneshiro Science and Innovation Center and the Sidney and Minnie Kosasa Performance Studios and Courtyard were both opened for the 2019 school year. These state-of-the-art and eco-conscious facilities allow the K-1 community at Iolani School to embrace their creativity with the aid of a number of decorations created in the school's Sullivan Center for Innovation and Leadership.  An interactive organ was installed as well.

Athletics
Iolani School's athletic program was founded in 1932 by Father Kenneth A. Bray.  Over 900, or 70%, of the student body, participates in one of over 32 competitive sports. Iolani School is a member of the Interscholastic League of Honolulu, an athletic conference composed of Honolulu-area private schools.

Since the formation of the Hawaii High School Athletic Association, Iolani has won over 75 state championships in various sports. It is the only school in Hawaii to have won five consecutive state championships in Boys Basketball from 2002 to 2006. Iolani has the most consecutive state championships in Boys Wrestling, and is the first ILH school to win a Girls Wrestling State Championship in 2005. They also have eight consecutive D-II football titles, highest in the nation.

Curriculum
Iolani School's campus is divided into two sections: Lower School and Upper School.

Lower School is for elementary students, kindergarten through 6th grade.

Upper School is 7th through 12th grade. The daily schedule has six periods that rotate weekly unless circumstances, such as an assembly or early dismissal, call for eight shorter periods or four extended periods. These schedules are labeled A through D, with special schedules E and F (as well as E and F 1, E and F 2, etc.) for extended periods, assembly schedules, and chapel schedules among others. Each student normally has one study hall or free period and one elective, although new students who do not take a language normally have a second study hall or elective.

Summer school
Iolani summer school allows students to earn graduation credits; credit courses offered during summer include art, history, science, computers, and language.

Harold Keables
Harold Keables was first a teacher in Denver, where he was named the National Teacher of the Year by Life magazine; in 1965 he started teaching at Iolani School. Each year his legacy is honored via the Keables Chair, which brings "outstanding teachers, writers, and artists to Iolani."

Yearly Events
There are a number of events that Iolani holds every year. These pertain to fundraising, performing arts, and chapel among other topics.

Iolani Fair
The Iolani Fair has been held every year in late April to fundraise for student expenditures. Initially started as the Fun Festival in 1948, it would later become the Carnival, and eventually in 1990, the Fair. Themes for each year were introduced shortly thereafter. The fair typically consists of different sections including food stands, games, rides, a silent auction, a video game center, a white elephant sale, and a marketplace. While the fair was canceled in 2020 and 2021, it is set to return in 2022.

Keables Chair and Scholar

May Day

Orchestral Performances

Iolani Dramatic Players Performances

Founder's Day

Hoike

Christmas Nativity Chapel

Giving Day

Extracurriculars
Iolani students are involved in many extracurricular activities from academic to interest-led.

Imua Iolani
Imua Iolani is the school newspaper. It is published monthly, distributed to all students, and is available online. In 2008, Imua Iolani was named the best school newspaper in the state.

Math Team
The 'Iolani math team has been participating in the Oahu Mathematics League since the mid 1970s (the league was started in the 1968–69 school year).  The team has won the league championship in 1977, 1981, 1984, 1990, 1991, and from 1993 to the present.  This marks 34 total championships, including the past 29. This streak is tied with the Punahou boys swimming team for the longest state championship streak of any competition in Hawaii. The JV team has claimed the top spot ever since the inception of the JV division in the 2000–01 school year.  Also, 'Iolani holds the record for placing first 18 times in the Hawaii State Math Bowl (which was started in 1978).

Science Olympiad
'Iolani has two Science Olympiad Teams, Division B (grades 6–9) and Division C (9-12).

Division B has been a part of Science Olympiad since 2012. They have qualified for the national tournament twice (in 2012 and 2014). For every other year they have competed, they have been the runner-up at the states competition. In the 2012 National Competition, Division B placed 5th in Water Quality.

Division C has been a part of Science Olympiad since 2011. They have qualified for the national tournament every year they have competed, except for 2013 when they placed as runner up. At the 2014 national tournament at the University of Florida, the team was the national champions in the trial event Hydrogeology. At the 2015 national tournament at the University of Nebraska-Lincoln, Division C was the national champions in both Fossils and Geologic Mapping and placed 2nd in the trial event Science Bowl. In the 2016 National competition, the Division C team was the national champions in Fossils, and placed 3rd in Game On and Anatomy and Physiology, and 4th in Geologic Mapping. They also placed 2nd in Game On and 3rd in Indoor Bottle Rocket at the 2017 National competition.

Speech and Debate
Iolani has an Intermediate Speech Team (grades 7–8) and a Speech and Debate Team (9-12). Both teams have won numerous competitions. Every February, the school hosts the Iolani Debate Tournament, one of three State-Qualifying tournaments of the season.

Real World Design Challenge
In 2009, Iolani's team "NDC" became the national champions at the U.S. Department of Energy's Real World Design Challenge, out of nine other teams from nine other states. In 2010, the Iolani ZAMA team took first at the state level. Team members J. Hara, C. Kodama, E. Masutani, M. Muraoka, D. Reiss, T. Van Etten, M. Williams represented the state of Hawaii March 26–29, 2010 at the Smithsonian Air and Space Museum in Washington, D.C., placing second at the national level.

Robotics
Iolani School also has several robotics teams which participate in competitions organized by FIRST. Iolani has a FIRST Robotics team, a FIRST Lego League team, and a Junior FIRST Lego League team. Besides FIRST related teams, Iolani also has a Botball team and a Vex team. Iolani's team number for VEX and FRC is 2438.

Vex
In 2008, Iolani's Vex team competed in the VEX World Robotics Competition, held at California State University Northridge.

Iolani School typically hosts the East Oahu VEX Robotics Competition.

On December 6, 2008, the Vex team competed in the 2008 VEX Pan Pacific Competition, held at the Hawaii Convention Center. The Iolani team (2438a) was part of the winning alliance, and qualified for the 2009 VEX World Robotics Competition, to be held at Dallas, Texas. They won the Community award and the Champion award.

In 2010, Iolani's VEX team again qualified for the World Competition by being part of the winning alliance at the Kahala VEX Regional. At the 2010 VEX World Robotics Competition, they won the notable CREATE award for design, as well as placing as division semifinalists.

In the 2011 VRC season, Iolani's VEX team again was in the winning alliance at the Pan Pacific Competition.

FLL
Iolani's FIRST Lego League team won the Hawaii State Championships in 2007. They competed at the World Festival in 2008 as the representative for Hawaii.

Two of the FLL teams competed in the Niu Valley qualifier on December 6, 2008; both teams qualified for the Hawaii State Championships to be held in January 2009.  The teams took first and second place, and merged to form one team that traveled to Dayton, Ohio, for the US Open Championships.  They won third place in Quality Robot Design and first place in the Alliance Rounds along with the Landroids and the ZBots.  Iolani's FLL team is the only FLL team to win twice at the Hawaii FLL State Championships.

FIRST Tech Challenge (FTC)
As of October 2017, Iolani has 3 FTC teams.

Economics Challenge
Every spring, the Iolani Economics Challenge team led by coach Lance Suzuki competes in the state, regional, and national economics challenge.  Iolani has won ten consecutive state championships and has won the national championship in 2005 and 2006 at the A.P. level and in 2007 at the non-A.P. level. In May 2010, the team of Sean Cockey, Andrew Ellison, Jesse Franklin-Murdock, and Mark Grozen-Smith defeated a team from Bellaire High School in Bellaire, Texas, to win another national title. 'Iolani also won the national title in 2013.

Gender-Sexuality Alliance (GSA)
Iolani School's Gender-Sexuality Alliance strives to promote inclusivity on campus and allow spaces for discussions on contemporary issues such as gender identity, pronouns, and sexuality through student-submitted questions, in addition to ice breakers for members and media with representation LGBTQIA+ individuals. Furthermore, the club provides website resources for students to utilize if necessary. Every year, the club holds its annual No Name-Calling Week in conjunction with the Chapel Council to bring to light the issue of bullying and discrimination, as well as participating and walking in Oahu's annual Pride parade.  While originally named the Gay-straight alliance, the club decided to change its name in order to foster greater inclusivity of students and identities.

Among Us Club
Created recently in 2022, the Among Us club allows students to gather around the hit mobile and computer game, "Among Us." The game gained popularity during the peak of the COVID-19 pandemic and has continued to gain traction at 'Iolani School over the past few years. Members attend tri-weekly meetings and will participate in a number of activities including playing the game with peers. Other activities include the "Create Your Imposter" drawing game where students draw their own "Among Us," characters.

Model United Nations (MUN)
Originally the 'Iolani School International Affairs Association, or ISIAA, Iolani's Model United Nations club has competed in various conferences since its founding in 2011. With the help of coaching by two advisers and student leadership, the numerous delegates who have joined since the club's founding have competed in a number of conferences, amassing a multitude of awards from different committees. Examples include the annual PacMUN conference, as well as international conferences such as AJMUN and VMUN, in addition to national conferences such as SCVMUN.  Delegates from Iolani, in addition to competing, often help to staff and run conferences held around the island, allowing for a learning experience for all delegates. Many of these delegates have continued to participate in Model UN in college as well. Iolani runs its annual conference IoMUNC in autumn, with beginner, intermediate, and advanced committees chaired and staffed by members of Iolani's delegation with the participation of schools around the island.

Chamber Music Program
The chamber music program at Iolani School allows for talented students to be coached weekly by virtuosic musicians from around Hawaii. During the semester, each group practices and prepares a piece to be performed at a recital held in the middle and end of the school year. Pieces from all different periods of classical music are performed and are not restricted to a specific time period or composer. These quartets are possible due to the gracious support of sponsors and continue the musical growth and education of Iolani students, allowing for the unique experience of playing in chamber ensembles.

Rubik's Cube Club
Established in 2020, the Rubik's Cube Club has provided a space for Rubik's Cube aficionados to hone their skills in Speedcubing. Through multiple members of the World Cube Association's participation, the club has continued to expand and reach up to the standards of competition.

Surf Club
The active participation of Iolani's surf club in numerous competitions around the island has yielded great achievements to its members. The club's members participate in the annual Hawaii Surf Association's yearly competition, participating in both divisions of the shortboard, longboard, and bodyboard events.

Notable alumni

Sportspeople
Bern Brostek '85, former professional football player for Los Angeles Rams and St. Louis Rams
Mike Fetters '83, former Major League Baseball pitcher for California Angels, Milwaukee Brewers, Oakland Athletics, Baltimore Orioles, Los Angeles Dodgers, Pittsburgh Pirates, Arizona Diamondbacks and Minnesota Twins, coach for Diamondbacks
Duke Hashimoto, former professional soccer player with Real Salt Lake in Major League Soccer
Kila Ka'aihue, Major League Baseball, first baseman for Oakland Athletics
Morgan Langley '07, professional soccer player with Harrisburg City Islanders in USL Pro
Derrick Low '04, professional basketball player for Maccabi Haifa team of Israeli Basketball Super League
Ed Ta'amu, offensive lineman, Arena Football League; fourth round (132nd overall) draft selection of NFL's Minnesota Vikings
Taylor Takata '00, competed in 2008 Beijing Olympics in judo, taking ninth place
Bobby Webster, '02 General Manager for NBA Toronto Raptors

Authors, editors and journalists
Jeff Chang 1985, author of Can't Stop Won't Stop: A History of the Hip-Hop Generation
Kanoa Leahey 1995, sportscaster (KHON-TV)
Mike Woitalla 1982, sports journalist and executive editor of Soccer America

Business
Guy Kawasaki '72, one of original Apple employees responsible for marketing of Macintosh in 1984; CEO and author

Clergy
Lani Hanchett '37, first bishop of Hawaiian descent of Episcopal Diocese of Hawaii
Richard Sui On Chang '59, fourth bishop of Episcopal Diocese of Hawaii

Education
Cheryl Hayashi '85, MacArthur Prize winner, Professor of biology at the University of California, Riverside
Ronald Takaki '57, former Professor of ethnic studies at the University of California, Berkeley
Michael G. Vann '85, historian of the French Colonial Empire, former President of the French Colonial Historical Society, two time Fulbright scholar, Associate Professor of History, California State University, Sacramento

Entertainment
Angela Aki, pop singer-songwriter active in Japan, known in West for song "Kiss Me Good-Bye", theme for video game Final Fantasy XII
Chris Lee '75, former president of production for TriStar Pictures, executive producer of Superman Returns
Clyde Kusatsu '66, film and television actor
Danny Yamashiro '86, radio host of The Good Life Hawaii Show, motivational speaker, author and minister
Grace Nikae, concert pianist
Kamuela Kahoano '98, singer/songwriter
Professor Tanaka '49, professional wrestler, actor
Jandi Lin ‘03, Adult Film star

Notable faculty and coaches
Father Kenneth A. Bray, established "One Team" philosophy of Hawaii's teachers, students and coaches; member of Hawaii Sports Hall of Fame
Eddie Hamada '46 (1928–2010), teacher, athletic director and football coach (1959–91)
Dolores Kendrick, second Poet Laureate of the District of Columbia (1967-1968)

Government

Monarchial government
Robert Hoapili Baker (attended St. Alban's; 1860s–1870s), governor of Maui, legislator and friend of King Kalākaua
Curtis P. Iaukea (attended St. Alban's; 1863–1871), Hawaiian courtier, diplomat and official of monarchy, republic and territorial governments
David Leleo Kinimaka (attended St. Alban's; 1860s–1870s), royal guard captain
Samuel Nowlein (attended St. Alban's; 1860s–1870s), royal guard captain and revolutionist
William Pūnohu White (attended St. Alban's; 1860s–1870s), lawyer, police sheriff, legislator of monarchy and territory

Territorial government
John H. Wilson (attended St. Alban's; 1885), mayor of Honolulu

Federal government
Nani Coloretti '87, Deputy Secretary, U.S. Department of Housing and Urban Development
Jill Otake '91, U.S. District Court Judge, U.S. District Court for the District of Hawaii

State government
Mufi Hannemann '72, Mayor of Honolulu (2004-2010); President & CEO of Hawaii Lodging and Tourism Association (2011- present) 
Maile Shimabukuro '88, Democratic member of Hawaii State Senate
Chris Lee '99, member of Hawaii State House of Representatives (2008–present)
Stanley Chang '00, member of Hawaii State Senate

International government
Sun Yat-sen 1886, Chinese revolutionary, first president of Republic of China, co-founder of Kuomintang. He is also considered "the father of modern China" in both the mainland and Taiwan of China.

Royalty
Prince William Pitt Leleiohoku II (attended St. Alban's; 1860s–1870s), crown prince of Hawaii
Prince David Kawānanakoa (attended St. Alban's; 1874), patriarch of the House of Kawananakoa, in the line of succession for the Kingdom of Hawaii; a founder of the Democratic Party in Hawaii
Prince Jonah Kūhiō Kalanianaʻole (attended St. Alban's; 1870s), a ten-term congressional delegate
Prince Edward Abnel Keliʻiahonui (attended St. Alban's; 1870s)

Other
Chelsea Hardin, Miss Hawaii USA 2016 and first runner-up at Miss USA 2016

Notes

References
Hawaii High School Athletic Association

External links
Official Iolani Webpage

IolaniAlumni.com - Website for the Iolani Alumni Community
Iolani Ohana (Official Iolani Parent Ohana Webpage)

Preparatory schools in Hawaii
Private K-12 schools in Honolulu

Episcopal schools in the United States
1863 establishments in Hawaii
Educational institutions established in 1863